San Manuel may refer to the following:

Places
Argentina
San Manuel, Buenos Aires, a settlement in Lobería Partido

Honduras
San Manuel, Cortés

Philippines
San Manuel, Isabela
San Manuel, Pangasinan
San Manuel, Tarlac

United States
San Manuel, Arizona

People
 San Manuel Band of Mission Indians, a Serrano tribe in southern California